The 2019 LINAFOOT was the 3rd season of the LINAFOOT, the top Chadian league for association football clubs since its establishment in 2015.

Unlike the 1st LINAFOOT edition (in 2015) organised as a full national championship and won by Gazelle FC, this edition was organized under the play-off formula.

Elect-Sport FC won their sixth Chadian title. Goyam César (Avenir Sarh) was the league topscorer with 10 goals; Brahim Ngaroudal was voted the best player; Adoum Deffallah (Elect-Sport FC) was voted best goalkeeper; Francis Oumar Belonga (Elect-Sport FC) was voted the best coach.

Teams
A total of 12 teams competed in the tournament. Four teams qualified from N’Djamena:
Elect-Sport FC
AS CotonTchad
Gazelle FC
Renaissance FC
Eight teams qualified from provinces:
Renaissance de Moussoro
Scorpion de Bourkou
Avenir de Sarh
Educa de Moundou
Boule d’Or de Pala
AS Commune de Kélo
AS Eléphant de Zakouma d'Am-Timan
Renaissance d’Abèche

Group stage
The 12 teams were divided into two groups of six teams. The top team of each group qualified for the final. The group stage matches were played from 9 to 22 June 2019.

Group A

Group B

Final

Elect-Sport FC qualified for the 2019–20 CAF Champions League.
AS CotonTchad qualified for the 2019–20 CAF Confederation Cup.

References

Chad
Foo
Football leagues in Chad